American Eccentric Cinema is a mode of contemporary American filmmaking that emerged in what has been termed the metamodern or New Sincerity. Its attachment to indie cinema has led some to consider it a movement and genre of cinema in the United States. Its key filmmakers, including Wes Anderson, Charlie Kaufman, and Spike Jonze, are at times referred to as "The American Eccentrics". It occurred during the 1990s and 2000s, when indie directors sought to create films that diverted from the style and content of Hollywood franchise films. American Eccentric Cinema came in opposition to the mainstream ideas of formulaic narratives  and the digitisation within films and new technologies that came about during the time period. American eccentric cinema is marked by films that are “deeply concerned with ethics and morality, the obligations of the individual, the effects of family breakdown, and social alienation."

Background 
American Eccentric Cinema is critically conceived in response to traditional Hollywood and films of popular culture which often had clear, predictable characters and narratives. American Eccentric Cinema has been framed as influenced by the New Hollywood era. Both traditions have similar themes and narratives of existentialism and the need for human interaction. New Hollywood focuses on the darker elements of humanity and society within the context of the American Dream in the mid-1960s to the early 1980s. with themes that were reflective of sociocultural issues and were centered around the potential meaninglessness of pursuing the American Dream as generation upon generation motivated to possess it. In comparison, American Eccentric Cinema does not have a distinct context, its films show characters who are very individual and their concerns are very distinctive to their own personalities. American Eccentric cinema is considered a shift in contemporary American cinema in the 1990s and 2000s driven by metamodern philosophical and moral beliefs. Far Out Magazine critic, Swapnil Dhruv Bose, writes that "As a response to the suffocating excesses of the mainstream, many directors sought to examine the alienation imposed by modernity through fresh perspectives and unconventional methods. Although the creative consciousnesses of the artists vary to a great extent, their works have been collectively labelled as the ‘American Eccentric Cinema’ movement".

American Eccentric Cinema is also known as "American Smart Cinema", a  tradition delineated by Jeffrey Sconce and Claire Perkins. Both film traditions consist mostly of American indie films from the 1990s and 2000s and have similar aesthetic strategies, particularly the focus on irony. However, as Kim Wilkins notes, despite the crossovers between the two forms of cinema, American eccentricity "uses irony not primarily for its tonal qualities but, rather, for dramatic and thematic functions."

At a period of American history where postwar communities were growing older, many ideals were being re-evaluated and looked at critically in American Eccentric Cinema. The genre's films look at emotions and where they come from as well as expectations for what a happy life should be. American Eccentric Cinema sees happiness as not necessarily being in a domestic life; in a marriage or family. The filmmakers of the genre were influenced by their own lives where their perception of the domestic world could include feelings and emotions of "abandonment, alienation and frustration."

The film tradition also takes influences from Postmodernism through the movement's attitudes of irony and sensations of "detachment" to society. But whilst filmmakers of American Eccentric Cinema position themselves in a critical manner, they also strive to create significant and unique art forms through various techniques and film features employed.

Films of American Eccentric cinema are also made around the before, during and after phases of the September 11 attacks where social desires were primarily concerned with being safe and secure. At this time the rights and principles of American liberalism were being challenged and ideas of existentialism were common within art.

Characteristics 
While American eccentric cinema films have distinct individual and stylistic visions, they share common themes and textual practices. American Eccentric Cinema are concerned around an individual's internal dilemmas and existentialism as a human being, regardless of the context. The film techniques of the genre use aspects of mainstream cinema but alter the mainstream conventions slightly through characterisation, tone and style. American Eccentric cinema is also known for its use of inter-textual references, quotations and irony. By doing this, an audience's expectation of what may happen is subverted. Filmmakers go into the depth of a protagonist's journey finding their sense of self as the narrative.

American Eccentric Cinema falls within 'Independent Cinema' culture . Independent Cinema are types of films whose conventions oppose to Hollywood mainstream films with characteristics such as no "forwardmoving narrative drive" where the structure is not as ordered or bound by a sense of needed fast pace. Characters in Eccentric cinema divert from those in Mainstream Hollywood of being comprehensible with journeys having a distinct beginning, complicated middle and happy ending. 'Indie' characters, as well as American Eccentric Cinema characters, do not necessarily have goals to achieve in the films, or feel defined by them, and a sense of strength of morality may not be as present.

This type of cinema has been called "quirky", "cute" and "smart".

There are many alternate methods of exploring romantic love and sexuality within American Eccentric Cinema. The films explore gender roles as changing and often take a postfeminist stance. Characters often challenge and explore the expectations of marriage prior to the 1990s within the narrative as well as the complexities of sex and how society views it. Most characters are heterosexual and the complications of love are dealt with from the man-woman relationship perspective. However, director Todd Haynes, whom Swapnil Dhruv Bose labels a pioneer of the American Eccentric movement, comes as an exception as he explores LGBT relationships, with films that were part of the beginning of the New Queer Cinema movement.

Race is not explored as prevalently within American Eccentric films. According to Jesse Fox Mayshark portrayals of characters of a different race, that is not white, are categorised within a "comic ethnic type". Mayshark perceives lack of diversity as a direct correlation within the genre's directors being primarily white Americans who may think of "other races and cultures" as only outsiders, alien in their comedic nature. Kim Wilkins states that to date the politics and style of American Eccentric Cinema has been informed by the overwhelmingly white male middle-upper demographic of its key filmmakers. She writes "The focus in American eccentric films (like those in the “smart” tendency) on “white male urban sophisticates” situates them as a form of “men’s cinema,” in Stella Bruzzi’s terms. While neither existential anxiety nor irony is, in reality, the sovereign domain of white men, their cinematic articulation in the key films of the American eccentric mode, such as P.T. Anderson’s Magnolia or Punch Drunk Love, David O. Russell’s I Heart Huckabees or films by Wes Anderson or Charlie Kaufman, has largely evolved as a form “grounded in the relationship between, masculinity—its ideology as well as its representation—and aesthetics.” Indeed, many of these films position masculinity as bound to the inability to directly articulate anxiety. Thus, the use of irony in these films—both by characters and through aesthetic and formal strategies—is conveyed as a particularly masculine strategy; a means by which “ugly” feelings can be repackaged as intellectual gameplay while simultaneously begging to be recognized for what it truly is." She goes on to note that the focus on white, urban, heterosexual men in American Eccentric Cinema adds to its relationship with neoliberalism: "It cannot be ignored that the protagonists of American eccentric films are not only
male but, on the whole, tend come from socioeconomically privileged backgrounds. The socioeconomic (and gendered) status of these characters situates them as those most likely to succeed within capitalist systems. Unlike indie films within realist modes, such as the neorealist works of Kelly Reichardt or Sean Baker, American Eccentric Cinema does not tend to portray characters at crossroads where decisions made or changing circumstances have the capacity to fundamentally affect their livelihoods, safety, or personal agency. Often the absurd narrative goals of characters are only possible within these films because these characters are not beholden to the financial imperatives that drive more naturalistic characters toward what may be considered more realistic goals."

Politics is explored within the films, through the characters and their journeys. Rather than preaching political messages and creating controversial debates about political issues, they create subtle means to explore politics. Major events such as the September 11 attacks meant that the sense of American uncertainty that was pervading the national was reflected in themes such as self-doubt and insecurity within the characters.

Interpretations on defining the genre 
Scholars Kim Wilkins and Jesse Fox Mayshark have written extensively on American Eccentric Cinema and its place within film genre in their books: American Eccentric Cinema and Post-Pop Cinema: The Search for Meaning in New American Film.

Kim Wilkins, a film scholar at the University of Oslo, maintains that American eccentricity is a mode rather than a genre. She demarcates five criteria for the American eccentric mode: "1: The presence of allusion, parody, and intertextuality formally (in terms of genre and meta-cinematic depiction) and playfulness/cinephilia; 2: Sincere thematic underpinnings that are presented at a distance due to the film’s perceived “quirkiness,” amusing occurrences, and/or absurd aesthetic; 3: A form of ironic expression that is both reflexive and sincere; 4: Characters and cinematic worlds that are designed to encourage audience alignment despite being clearly constructed; and, above all, 5: Effective and intellectual engagement with an experience of existential anxiety". Wilkins analyses these textual tactics through four analytic lens—genre (with a focus on the road film), characterization, hyper-dialogue, and eccentric worlds. Although Wilkins states that American eccentricity is not an auteurist demarcation, she pays particular attention to the films of Spike Jonze and Wes Anderson. Wilkins explains that there is a distinct relationship between Neoliberalism and American Eccentric Cinema. Neoliberalism is a set of principles proposing "that human well-being can be best advanced by liberating entrepreneurial freedoms and skills". In a neoliberal world, the person will constantly be shifting and altering facets of their life such as expertise and abilities and even their own sense of self to keep up with what is happening within the economy. Within American Eccentric films, this idea of neoliberalism aligns to the films' desire to portray individuals as their own selves rather than purely "national or community citizens". Wilkins states that because of this, and individuals not belonging in a community, it provides a foundation for many existential tensions and anxieties that are explored in the films. Thus, she concludes that American Eccentric cinema responds to neoliberalism, as well as the existential concerns that were present during the New Hollywood era through means that are presented as ahistoric and primarily concerned with the characters' own experiences rather than broader socio-cultural or political concerns.

Jesse Fox Mayshark, an editor at the New York Times,  writes on American Eccentric Cinema filmmakers and analyses specific films within the genre. Mayshark says that the group of filmmakers were not explicitly categorised within any genre at the beginning of the movement because their films were extremely niche and individual, with vary styles and conventions. Their work defied convention and saw a new-found exploration of dark human themes through being idiosyncratic and individual. They wanted the audience to feel like they were a part of the stories and have a "transcendent connection."

As technologies emerge so to have discussions surrounding the expansion of the Independent Cinema genre and subsequently, American Eccentric Cinema. In a 1999 keynote address at the Independent Spirit Awards in California, screenwriter and film producer, James Schamus "voiced the common concern that" commercial and major studios' "empires would ultimately threaten the existence" of Independent Cinema. "In Schmaus' evaluation, independent film is...in decline" however, other commentators see evolution and cultural "transition...to give way to new and different possibilities."

List of notable films

List of notable figures

Filmmakers 
 Wes Anderson
 Paul Thomas Anderson
 Richard Linklater
 Todd Haynes
 David O. Russell
 Charlie Kaufman
 Spike Jonze
 Michel Gondry
 David Fincher
 Sofia Coppola
 Richard Kelly
 Neil LaBute
 Todd Solondz
 Noah Baumbach
 Alexander Payne
 Peter Berg
 Hal Hartley
 Ang Lee
 John Herzfeld
 Whit Stillman
 Miranda July
 Lena Dunham
 Greta Gerwig
Alex Ross Perry
Mike Mills
Jared Hess
Jason Reitman
Kevin Smith

Actors 
 Ben Stiller
 Mark Wahlberg
 Bill Murray
 Julianne Moore
 Jason Schwartzman
 Owen Wilson
 Luke Wilson
 Elliot Page
 Frances McDormand
 Tilda Swinton
 Angelina Jolie
 Anjelica Huston
 Adrien Brody
 Adam Sandler
 Scarlett Johansson

Legacy
Rushmore, Slacker and Clerks were each inducted into the National Film Registry.

Three films of Wes Anderson (Grand Budapest Hotel, Royal Tenenbaums and Moonrise Kingdom) alongside Before Sunset, Lost in Translation, Eternal Sunshine of the Spotless Mind, Far From Heaven and Synecdoche, New York were listed on the BBC's 100 Greatest Films of the 21st Century.

References

See also
Generation X
Toronto New Wave
Independent Spirit Awards
Postmodernist film and television
Slow cinema
Transnational cinema
Music videos
Frat Pack
Alternative rock
Cinephilia
Maximalist and minimalist cinema
Indiewood

Film genres
1990s in film
2000s in film
2010s in film
Film genres particular to the United States
Postmodern art
Eccentricity (behavior)